Ernest Thomas Bethell (3 November 1872 – 1 May 1909), who is also known by his Korean name , was a British journalist who founded a newspaper, The Korea Daily News, antagonistic to Japanese rule.

Arrival in Korea
In 1904, Ernest Bethell travelled from Kobe, Japan, where he had been in the export business, to Korea as a correspondent for the Daily Chronicle, with the purpose of reporting on the Russo-Japanese War. He then continued to stay in Korea and reported on Japanese imperialism in Korea. Bethell soon noted the abuses by Japanese soldiers towards Koreans, and how Koreans were treated unfairly and as inferior to the Japanese.

Founding of Korean newspapers

He founded an early newspaper in Korea with Yang Gi-tak, a Korean independence activist, in 1904 called Daehan Maeil Sinbo (대한매일신보, 大韓每日申報, The Korea Daily News) which was published in both Korean and English. The publication was strongly antagonistic to Japanese rule in Korea. The paper was available in three versions – English, Korean, and Korean mixed script. Many people who opposed the Japanese rule, such as Park Eun-sik and Sin Chae-ho, wrote articles and columns in the paper.

Prosecution for sedition
At the time, British subjects enjoyed extraterritorial rights in Korea. Because the paper was published by a British subject, it was not subject to local law. However, in 1907, Bethell was prosecuted in the British Consular Court in Seoul for breach of the peace and given a good behaviour bond of six months.

The next year, at the request of the Japanese Residency-General, Bethell was prosecuted in the British Supreme Court for China and Corea (sic), sitting in Seoul, for sedition against the Japanese government of Korea. He was convicted of sedition and was sentenced by judge F.S.A. Bourne to three weeks of imprisonment and a six-month good behaviour bond. As there was no suitable jail in Korea, he was taken to Shanghai aboard  and detained at the British Consular Gaol in Shanghai.

Death
After being released, he returned to Seoul to continue his business. He died of cardiomegaly on 1 May 1909.

Monuments
The Korean people erected a monument in his honour, though it was defaced by the Japanese. Another monument was erected near the original one in 1964 by journalists living in South Korea. Both can be now seen at his grave at Yanghwajin Foreigners' Cemetery.

2012 Memorial service
On 8 May 2012 a special memorial service, organised by the Bethell Commemoration Committee, was held for Bethell at the Yanghwajin Foreigners' Cemetery. Former South Korean Prime Minister Lee Soo-sung chaired the ceremony and President Lee Myung-bak sent flowers to mark the event. About 250 people participated in the ceremony, also including Park Yoo-chul, chairman of the Korea Liberation Association.
British Ambassador Scott Wrightman spoke at the ceremony, saying:

References

Further reading

External links
 Arirang documentary on Consul-General Cockburn and Bethell (2012):  Part 1,  Part 2, Part 3 Part 4, Part 5, Part 6, Part 7
 News story (in Korean) on Bethell's fight with the Japanese
 

British reporters and correspondents
British war correspondents
20th-century deaths from tuberculosis
British people imprisoned abroad
Korean independence activists
1872 births
1909 deaths
History of Korea
Daily Mail journalists
Tuberculosis deaths in South Korea
British expatriates in Korea